SANEF may refer to:
Société des Autoroutes du Nord et de l'Est de la France, French motorway operator.
South African National Editors' Forum, professional journalist membership organisation.